Smile Records can refer to:

 Smile Records (Canada)
 Smile Records (US)

See also
 Painted Smiles Records
 Smile (The Beach Boys album)